is a Japanese tea and foods processing, packaging and distribution company based in Shimada City, Japan.

Outline
Harada was founded in 1917 and incorporated as a kabushiki gaisha in 1948. Its business activities are distributed between tea processing, packaging and distribution and the management of several company-owned and contracted tea plantations.

The company gained wider recognition in Japan from its long-running series of Yabukita Blend television advertisements.

References

External links
English Home English Website
ハラダ製茶株式会社 Website (Japanese)

Tea companies of Japan
Tea brands in Japan
Drink companies of Japan
Companies based in Shizuoka Prefecture